The Noyyal River is a small river in Western Tamil Nadu, and a tributary of Kaveri River. It rises from the Vellingiri hills in the Western Ghats in Tamil Nadu, very closer in proximity to Kerala border, and flows through many villages and the cities of Coimbatore, and Tirupur. Then finally, the river drains into the Kaveri River at Noyyal, a village in Karur district named after the river itself. Cultivated land in the basin amounts to  while the population density is 120 people per km² (311/mi²) in the countryside, and 1000 people per km² (2590/mi²) in the cities. The area is known for its scanty rainfall and the development of the Noyyal River Tanks System to hold any overflow from the rains plus the water of the Northeast and Southwest monsoon season was ecologically important. Kausika river, which originates along the northern side of Coimbatore district in the Western Ghats along with its consequent streams, lake and pond systems is an important tributory of the river. These interconnecting tanks held the water flowing from the Noyyal.

Ecology
The township of Coimbatore once was surrounded by the Noyyal river and its canals, tanks, and rivulets. The Noyyal river and its interconnected tank and canal system, believed to have been originally built by the Chalukya Cholas kings, was then an efficient system that provided water transport, storage, and maintained stable groundwater levels.  Surplus water from the Noyyal river spilled into the canals and were channeled to the tanks, preventing unwanted flooding. The tanks were a major factor in replenishing the ground water through percolation of the subsoil water. As urbanisation grew, the system was neglected and the number of functional tanks was drastically reduced until only eleven were left. Today the system no longer works and water is scarce. Agriculture has significantly decreased. Lacking irrigation water, lakhs of Coconut trees in the area have dried up.

History
The "Noyyal" is a sacred river in Tamil history. Its original name was Kanchimanadi as mentioned in Perur Puranam. But changed later to the name of the place where it drains into the Kaveri River in 1750 A.D.

The Noyyal village is situated at the banks of Noyyal and Kaveri (Ponni) rivers where they both merge. An ancient temple to the goddess SellandiAmman is also situated at the confluence (Sangamam).

Pollution
A critical issue is the pollution of the rivers Noyyal and Nallaru originating and flowing in the Kongu Nadu region. The river flows with natural antibiotic minerals.  The entire Orathuppalayam Dam has become a tank holding effluent and releases water after every rainfall, effectively polluting the down river villages in the Tirupur and Karur district.

However, from 2004 onwards, efforts by local volunteers organization Siruthuli have been trying to conserve the water resource. After several petitions from 2003 to 2011, dying and bleaching units were ordered closed on the river until zero liquid discharge status was achieved.

On 9 July 2018, the chief minister of Tamil Nadu announced that a sum of Rs. 150 crores would be earmarked for preventing pollution in of Noyyal within Tirupur city limits.

Geography
The Cheyyar River and the Kanchimanadhi are the tributaries to the river. They all have their origins in the Western Ghats. Periar flows out of the Siruvani hills and the Kovai Kuttralam, a landmark waterfalls. Chadiaar or Cheyyar River flows through Chaadivayal and later along with the other rivers join up at Kooduthurai to become Noyyal River.

Apart from these three rivers, there are numerous rivulets that also join Noyyal. But most of these rivulets carry water only during the rainy season and therefore are not perennial. According to the available sources, the number of rivulets are 34.

The fill absorbs water like a sponge. Only when the absorption reaches a saturation point does excess water flow to the suburbs and the city.

Dams and reservoirs
Noyyal contains two major dam Orathuppalayam (Near Chennimalai) and Aathupalayam Dam (Near Vellakoil) commissioned in the aim of irrigating about 20,000 acres of land in Tirupur and Karur districts. As of now Orathuppalayam dam stands decommissioned and acting as effluent tank for the Tirupur textile units.

The river has 23 check dams. Decades ago, it irrigated .

References

External links

Ecological project

The Noyyal River and Tiruppur

Rivers of Tamil Nadu
Tributaries of the Kaveri River
Water pollution in India
Geography of Coimbatore
Rivers of India
Water Heritage Sites in India